The Majiayao culture was a group of neolithic communities who lived primarily in the upper Yellow River region in eastern Gansu, eastern Qinghai and northern Sichuan, China. The culture existed from 3300 to 2000 BC. The Majiayao culture represents the first time that the upper Yellow River region was widely occupied by agricultural communities and it is famous for its painted pottery, which is regarded as a peak of pottery manufacturing at that time.

History
The archaeological site was first found in 1924 near the village of Majiayao in Lintao County, Gansu by Swedish archaeologist Johan Gunnar Andersson, who considered it part of the Yangshao culture.
Following the work of Xia Nai, the founder of modern archaeology in the People's Republic of China, it has since been considered a distinct culture, named after the original site, whereas previously it had been referred to as the "Gansu Yangshao" culture.
This culture developed from the middle Yangshao (Miaodigou) phase, through an intermediate Shilingxia phase.
The culture is often divided into three phases: Majiayao (3300–2500 BC), Banshan (2500–2300 BC) and Machang (2300–2000 BC).

At the end of the 3rd millennium BC, the Qijia culture succeeded the Majiayao culture at sites in three main geographic zones: eastern Gansu, central Gansu, and western Gansu/eastern Qinghai.

Location
Majiayao phase (3300–2500 BC) sites are mostly found on terraces along: the upper Wei River valley; upper Bailong River valley; middle and lower Tao River and Daxia River valleys; upper Yellow River valley; the Huangshui River; and lower Datong River.

Pottery
The most distinctive artifacts of the Majiayao culture are the painted pottery. During the Majiayao phase, potters decorated their wares with designs in black pigment featuring sweeping parallel lines and dots. Pottery of the Banshan phase is distinguished by curvilinear designs using both black and red paints. Machang-phase pottery is similar, but often not as carefully finished. Its development is associated with interaction between hunter-gatherers in the Qinghai region and the westward expansion of agricultural Yangshao people.

In contrast to plain pottery, the Majiayao painted pottery was produced at large, centralised workshops. The largest Neolithic workshop found in China is at Baidaogouping, Gansu. The manufacture of large amounts of painted pottery means there were professional craftspeople to produce it, which is taken to indicate increasing social complexity. Control over the production process and quality declined by the Banshan phase, potentially due to greater demand for pottery to use in funeral rituals, similar to what Hung Ling-yu calls the "modern Wal-Mart syndrome".

Bronze

The oldest bronze object found in China was a knife found at a Majiayao site in Dongxiang, Gansu, and dated to 2900–2740 BC.
Further copper and bronze objects have been found at Machang-period sites in Gansu.
Metallurgy spread to the middle and lower Yellow River region in the late 3rd millennium BC.

Climate changes
Scholars have come to the conclusion that the development of the Majiayao culture was highly related to climate changes. A group of scholars from Lanzhou University have researched climate changes during the Majiayao culture and the results indicate that the climate was wet during 5830 to 4900 BP, which promoted the development of early and middle Majiayao culture in eastern Qinghai province. However, from 4900 to 4700 BP, the climate underwent droughts in this area, which may be responsible for the decline and eastward movement of prehistoric cultures during the period of transition from early-mid to late Majiayao culture.

The transition from Yangshao to Majiayao coincides, climatically, with the Piora Oscillation.

See also
 History of metallurgy in China
 List of Neolithic cultures of China
 Three Sovereigns and Five Emperors
 Xia dynasty
 Xishanping

Notes

References

 
 
 
 
 

Neolithic cultures of China
Bronze Age in China
4th-millennium BC establishments